Leona is a 2018 Mexican drama film and the feature film directorial debut of Isaac Cherem. It was written by Cherem and Naian González Norvind. González Norvind also stars as the protagonist as a young Jewish woman in Mexico City that falls for a non-Jewish man, Iván (Christian Vazquez).

The film premiered at the Morelia International Film Festival on 22 October 2018. The film also featured in the schedule of several international Jewish film festivals such as Philadelphia Jewish Film Festival, Atlanta Jewish Film Festival, Poland's Jewish Motifs International Film Festival and the UK Jewish Film Festival. According to Cherem, the film was released in Mexican cinemas in October 2019 followed by a North American theatrical release by Menemsha Films between the next year and 2021.

Plot summary
Ariela, a young artist in Mexico City from a Syrian Jewish family is pressured into finding an appropriate partner. She develops feelings for a non-Jewish man, Iván (Christian Vazquez). This presents her with a dilemma as she weighs up the relationship against the disapproval of her family and community.

Cast
Naian González Norvind as Ariela
Christian Vazquez as Iván
Carolina Politi as Estrella
Daniel Adissi as Gabriel
Margarita Sanz as Abuela
Ana Kupfer as Rebeca
Emma Dib as Liz
Rodrigo Corea as Miguel
Elias Fasja as Simón 
Ricardo Fastlicht as Moisés 
Adriana Llabres as Cordelia

Reception
The film has won a number of awards, with Naian González Norvind taking the Best Actress prize at the 2018 Morelia International Film Festival.

References

External links
 

2018 films
Mexican drama films
2010s Spanish-language films
Films about Jews and Judaism
Interfaith romance films
2018 drama films
2010s Mexican films